La noche más hermosa is a 1983 film directed by Manuel Gutiérrez Aragón and starring José M. Sacristán, Victoria Abril, and Bibi Andersen.  A reviewer for All Movie Guide called an "ostensible comedy" and said it was "almost as hard to believe as director Manuel Gutiérrez-Aragón's previous effort Feroz."

References

External links
 

1983 films
1980s Spanish-language films
Spanish drama films
Spanish LGBT-related films
Bisexuality-related films
Films directed by Manuel Gutiérrez Aragón
1980s Spanish films